Abdelhamid Sadmi (born January 1, 1961) is an Algerian international football defender who played for Algeria in the 1986 FIFA World Cup, as well as the 1984 African Cup of Nations and the 1986 African Cup of Nations. At the club level, he spent his entire senior career with JS Kabylie with whom he won the African Cup of Champions Clubs twice in 1981 and 1990.

Club career
Born in Azazga, Sadmi started playing football for his home town club of JS Azazga. There he was spotted by a JS Kabylie scout who brought him to the club. In the 1978–1979 season, at just 17 years of age, he was handed his first team debut by coach Mahieddine Khalef.

International career
On March 11, 1984, Sadmi made his debut for the Algeria National Team in the final group game of the 1984 African Cup of Nations against Nigeria, coming on as a substitute at half-time. Three days later, he went on to make his first start in the following game against Cameroon in the semi-final, with Algeria losing 5-4 in the penalty shoot-out.

In total, he made 27 appearances for Algeria.

Honours
 African Cup of Champions Clubs
 Winner: 1981, 1990
 Algerian Championnat National
 Winner: 1980, 1982, 1983, 1985, 1986, 1989, 1990
 Algerian Cup
 Winner: 1986, 1992
 Algerian Super Cup
 Winner: 1992

References

External links
FIFA profile

1961 births
1984 African Cup of Nations players
1986 African Cup of Nations players
1986 FIFA World Cup players
People from Azazga
Algerian footballers
Algeria international footballers
Association football defenders
JS Kabylie players
Living people
Kabyle people
21st-century Algerian people